Neorickettsia sennetsu  is a Gram-negative bacterium that causes Sennetsu ehrlichiosis.

See also
Neorickettsia risticii

References

Rickettsiales
Bacteria described in 2001